India Joy Eisley (born October 29, 1993) is an American actress. She is known for her role as Ashley Juergens in the ABC Family television series The Secret Life of the American Teenager, Eve in the 2012 film Underworld: Awakening, Sawa in the 2014 film Kite, Audrina in the 2016 television film My Sweet Audrina, and Fauna Hodel on the 2019 TNT series I Am the Night.

Early life
India Joy Eisley was born in Los Angeles on October 29, 1993, the daughter of English actress Olivia Hussey and American musician David Glen Eisley. Her paternal grandfather was American actor Anthony Eisley, while her maternal grandfather was Argentinian opera singer, Andreas Osuna. She has two older maternal half-brothers from her mother's prior marriages: Alexander (born 1973), whose father is American actor Dean Paul Martin, and Max (born 1983), whose father is Japanese singer Akira Fuse.

Career
Eisley and her mother appeared together in the 2005 movie Headspace. After small roles in various independent films, Eisley gained a major role in 2008 in The Secret Life of the American Teenager. She played Ashley Juergens, younger sister of teen mother Amy Juergens. 

In the 2012 film Underworld: Awakening, Eisley was cast as Eve, the hybrid daughter of Selene and Michael Corvin; Eisley was cast due to her strong resemblance to Selene's actress, Kate Beckinsale.  

Eisley starred as Sawa in the 2014 action film Kite, opposite Samuel L. Jackson. In late 2014, she filmed Social Suicide (2015), a modern retelling of Romeo and Juliet, appearing with her real-life mother Olivia Hussey, who played Mrs. Coulson, with Eisley playing her daughter, Julia.

In 2015, Eisley starred in the horror-thriller film The Curse of Sleeping Beauty as Briar Rose. The same year, she was cast in the titular role in the television film adaptation of the V. C. Andrews' book My Sweet Audrina for Lifetime, which aired in 2016. In 2017, she starred in the Netflix original film Clinical. In 2018, Eisley played the lead role of Maria in the psychological thriller film Look Away.

Author Jessica Brody has expressed a desire for Eisley to portray her character Seraphina in the film adaptation of her novel Unremembered. Hollywood casting director Michelle Levy was first to recommend Eisley for the role.

In 2019, Eisley starred as Fauna Hodel in the six-part limited series I Am the Night, which is based on Hodel's memoir One Day She'll Darken: The Mysterious Beginnings of Fauna Hodel. The series premiered on January 27, 2019, on TNT. In 2020, she played Tillie Gardner in the film Dead Reckoning. In 2021, she played Lucy in the film Every Breath You Take''.

Filmography

Film

Television

References

External links

 
 

1993 births
21st-century American actresses
Actresses from Los Angeles
American child actresses
American film actresses
American television actresses
Living people
American people of English descent
American people of Argentine descent
Hispanic and Latino American actresses